F1 Pole Position may refer to:
 F1 Pole Position (video game), a 1992 Super Nintendo Entertainment System racing game
 [[Satoru Nakajima F-1 Hero GB World Championship '91|F1 Pole Position (Game Boy)]], a 1993 Game Boy racing game released
 F1 Pole Position 64, a 1997 Nintendo 64 racing video game
 Pole Position (video game), a 1982 racing video game
 Pole Position II'', a 1983 sequel to Pole Position